Kemalpaşa District is a district of Artvin Province of Turkey. Its seat is the town Kemalpaşa. Its area is 74 km2, and its population is 8,974 (2021). The district was established in 2017. It lies on the Black Sea coast and has a border crossing with Georgia at Sarp/Sarpi.

Composition
There is one municipality in Kemalpaşa District:
 Kemalpaşa

There are 12 villages in Kemalpaşa District:

 Akdere
 Çamurlu
 Dereiçi
 Gümüşdere
 Karaosmaniye
 Kayaköy
 Kazimiye
 Köprücü
 Liman
 Osmaniye
 Sarp
 Üçkardeş

References

Districts of Artvin Province